John Jobst, S.A.C. (German: Johannes Jobst; 4 February 1920 – 5 July 2014), was a German Pallottine and prelate of the Roman Catholic Church. He was the last German bishop to have attended the Second Vatican Council.

Jobst was born in Frankenberg, Germany and ordained a priest on 9 July 1950 for the Society of the Catholic Apostolate. He was appointed vicar apostolic of the Kimberleys on 13 January 1959 as well as titular bishop of Pitanae, and was consecrated on 19 March 1959. He was appointed to the newly created diocese of Broome and remained there until his retirement on 3 November 1995.

Bishop Jobst was awarded the Order of the British Empire - Commander (Civil) in June 1981.

He died on 5 July 2014 in Patsch, Austria, aged 94.

References

1920 births
2014 deaths
20th-century German Roman Catholic bishops
Participants in the Second Vatican Council
German expatriates in Australia
Roman Catholic bishops of Broome
20th-century German Roman Catholic priests